Laurence Russ Veysey (1932–2004) was a historian best known for his history of higher education, The Emergence of the American University. He also wrote The Communal Experience.

Notes

References 

 
 
 
 
 

1932 births
2004 deaths
American historians of education